Cadence Brace (born 25 February 2005) is a Canadian tennis player.

Brace has a career high WTA singles ranking of 469 achieved on 22 August 2022. She also has a career high WTA doubles ranking of 1163 achieved on 15 August 2022.

Brace made her WTA main draw debut at the 2022 Championnats Banque Nationale de Granby after qualifying for the singles main draw.

ITF Finals

Singles: 1 (0 titles, 1 runner-up)

References

External links

2005 births
Living people
Canadian female tennis players
Tennis players from Toronto
21st-century Canadian women